Patricia L. Brubaker is a Canadian physiologist, currently a Canada Research Chair in Vascular and Metabolic Biology at University of Toronto.

References

Year of birth missing (living people)
Living people
Academic staff of the University of Toronto
Canadian physiologists